The 2019–20 Alabama Crimson Tide women's basketball team represents the University of Alabama during the 2019–20 NCAA Division I women's basketball season. The Crimson Tide, led by seventh-year head coach Kristy Curry, play their home games at Coleman Coliseum and compete as members of the Southeastern Conference (SEC).

Departures

Roster

Preseason

SEC media poll
The SEC media poll was released on October 15, 2019.

Schedule

|-
!colspan=9 style=| Exhibition

|-
!colspan=9 style=| Non-conference regular season

|-
!colspan=9 style=| SEC regular season

|-
!colspan=9 style=| SEC Tournament

References

Alabama Crimson Tide women's basketball seasons
Alabama
Alabama Crimson Tide
Alabama Crimson Tide